Bhootayyana Mommaga Ayyu is a 2018 Indian Kannada-language comedy film written and directed by Nagaraj Peenya. Produced by R. Varaprasad Shetty under the banner of Sri Vaishnavi Cine Creations, the film released across Karnataka state on 4 May 2018. Starring Chikkanna as Ayyu, the film also features Bullet Prakash, Sruthi Hariharan, Prashanth Siddhi and Tabla Nani in principal roles. The film marks the 1000th acting assignment of the comedy actor Honnavalli Krishna. The film score and  soundtrack is composed by Ravi Basrur and the cinematography is by Nandakumar.

Although the title is borrowed from the 1974 film Bhootayyana Maga Ayyu directed by Siddalingaiah, the film's plot makes no connection with it. Actor Lokesh's son Srujan Lokesh was hired as a narrator for this film. Upon release, the film met with negative response from the critics.

Cast
 Chikkanna as Ayyu
 Sruthi Hariharan as Sruthi
 Tabla Nani
 Bullet Prakash
 P. Ravishankar
 Prashanth Siddi
 Rockline Sudhakar 
 Honnavalli Krishna
 M. S. Umesh
 Girija Lokesh

Soundtrack
Ravi Basrur has composed the soundtrack for the film. The lyrics for the songs are written by Peenya Nagaraj. The song "Bhootayyana Mommaga" was performed by Basrur and Ananya Bhat.

References

External links
 
 

2018 films
2010s Kannada-language films
Indian comedy films
Films shot in Mysore
2018 comedy films